Pombal is a city and a municipality located in the Leiria District in the sub region of Pinhal Litoral in Portugal. The population in 2011 was 55,217, in an area of 626.00 km2. The population of the city of Pombal proper is about 18,000 inhabitants.

The municipality is served by a railway station which is part of the Linha do Norte, the main Portuguese railway line that connects its two largest cities, Lisbon and Porto.

The Mayor is Luís Diogo de Paiva Morão Alves Mateus since 2013, elected by the Social Democratic Party. The municipal holiday is November 11 and celebrates St. Martin's Day.

In 2017, an 82-foot-long skeleton of a possible sauropod dinosaur was uncovered in a Pombal property owner's backyard.

Parishes
Administratively, the municipality is divided into 13 civil parishes (freguesias):

Abiul
Almagreira
Carnide
Carriço
Guia, Ilha e Mata Mourisca
Louriçal
Meirinhas
Pelariga
Pombal
Redinha
Santiago e São Simão de Litém e Albergaria dos Doze
Vermoil
Vila Cã

Heritage sites
Castle of Pombal
House of the Marquis of Pombal

Notable people
Sebastião José de Carvalho e Melo, 1st Marquis of Pombal (1699-1782 in Pombal) a Portuguese statesman and diplomat, chief minister to King Joseph I, 1750 to 1777
Pedro Roma (born 1970 in Pombal) a football goalkeeper with 386 club caps, mainly for Académica
Carlos Mota Pinto (born 1936 in Pombal) a politician and the 7th Prime Minister of the Third Portuguese Republic

References

External links

Municipality official website
 Portal promotional of Pombal - Portugal
Photos from Pombal

Pombal
Populated places in Leiria District
Municipalities of Leiria District